This is a list of active and extinct volcanoes in Argentina.

Volcanoes

References 

 
Volcanoes
Argentina
.